Eddie Arning (1898–1993) was an American artist. He was born in the farming community of Germania, Texas.  As a young adult, he was admitted into a Texas mental institution for violent acts.  In 1964, after 60 years in the institution, he was introduced to crayons by Helen Mayfield, an Austin artist who worked in the hospital that summer, and began coloring. After a few years of using crayons, Arning switched to oil pastels and began producing more complex compositions.  His early works were autobiographical and depict scenes from his childhood with animals, flowers, windmills and churches.  Later, Arning became inspired by newspapers, advertisements and magazine illustrations and was producing more graphic images.  Over ten years, Arning produced over 2000 drawings.  His work has been likened to styles in avant-garde twentieth-century art.  Arning stopped drawing suddenly in 1973 when he was forced to leave his home because of "bad conduct."  Arning is represented in numerous museums, including the Minneapolis Institute of Art, Museum of Fine Arts, Boston, Smithsonian American Art Museum, Washington, D.C.  American Folk Art Museum, New York. and the Art Museum of Southeast Texas, Beaumont, Texas.

References

Further reading
Raw Vision, Pamela Jane Sachant, Issue 28, 1999, pp.28-35

1898 births
1993 deaths
Artists from Texas
Outsider artists
People from Midland County, Texas
20th-century American artists